Clements Hall, formerly known as Atkins Hall, is a historic building on the campus of Southern Methodist University in University Park, Texas, U.S.. It was built in 1915, and designed by Shepley, Rutan and Coolidge in the Georgian Revival architectural style. It has been listed on the National Register of Historic Places since September 27, 1980.

It is a four-story building.

See also

National Register of Historic Places listings in Dallas County, Texas

References

External links

National Register of Historic Places in Dallas County, Texas
Georgian architecture in Texas
Buildings and structures completed in 1915
Southern Methodist University